Raton or Ratón (Spanish for "mouse") may refer to:

Places:
  Raton Basin, a geologic structural basin in southern Colorado and northern New Mexico
  Raton, New Mexico, the county seat of Colfax County, New Mexico
  Raton Downtown Historic District, a Registered Historic District in Raton, New Mexico
  Raton Pass, a mountain pass that is a National Historic Landmark
 Ráton, the Hungarian name for Ratin village, Crasna, Sălaj, Romania

Other uses: 
 Ratón (2001-2013), a Spanish fighting bull
 , a submarine
 Raton, the French name of a character in Fontaine's fable The Monkey and the Cat

See also
 El Ratón (disambiguation)